Matteo Procopio (nato il 4 luglio 1996) è un calciatore professionista italiano di ruolo difensore attualmente svincolato

Club career
He made his Serie C debut for Cremonese on 4 September 2016 in a game against Renate.

On 31 January 2019, he joined Reggina on loan. On 25 July 2019, he was loaned to Lecco.

Honours

Club
Torino
Campionato Primavera: 2014–15

References

External links
 

1996 births
Footballers from Turin
Living people
Italian footballers
Association football defenders
U.S. Cremonese players
F.C. Südtirol players
Reggina 1914 players
Calcio Lecco 1912 players
Serie B players
Serie C players